The Minister for Defence is the Ghanaian government official responsible for the Ministry of Defence of Ghana and the Ghana Armed Forces. The Minister for Defence since February 2017 is the Hon. Dominic Nitiwul. He was appointed by President Nana Akufo-Addo.

List of ministers
The ministry has had a succession of ministers since independence starting with the Governor - General. During the rule of the Armed Forces Revolutionary Council, there was no specific minister as the council as a body was responsible for Defence.

See also
Ministry of Defence (Ghana)

References

External links
Minister for Defence, Official Ghana Government website

Politics of Ghana
Defence